On January 6, 2023, American school teacher Abby Zwerner was seriously injured when a six-year-old male student shot her while she was teaching in her classroom at Richneck Elementary School in Newport News, Virginia, United States. In his backpack, the boy had brought from home a 9mm semi-automatic pistol that belonged to his mother.

Zwerner's shooting provoked conversations about the culpability of very young shooters, and their parents, and comparisons with the 2000 killing of Kayla Rolland, that also committed by a six-year-old student.

Background
The shooting was the first U.S. school shooting of 2023, but the third incident of gun violence in Newport News Public School district in seventeen months. The shooting is one of sixteen U.S. school shootings perpetrated by shooters under the age of ten years since 1970. Richneck Elementary School is an elementary school in Newport News with 550 students. The school was equipped with metal detectors at the time of the shooting, which were randomly used to screen students.

Reports about the student's previous conduct included behavioral issues at school: cursing staff, trying to whip students with his belt, and choking a teacher. In 2021, the student allegedly came from behind his teacher, locked his forearms around her neck, and pulled her backward; he was subsequently moved to a different school. In the week before the shooting, the student reportedly slammed Zwerner's cell phone and broke it, resulting in a one-day suspension, with his first day back being the day of the shooting. 

Before the shooting, multiple staff members, including Zwerner, told school administrators about the student's conduct and concerns that he may have a weapon on him. Zwerner first alerted school officials between 11:15 and 11:30 am, stating that the student had threatened to beat up another student. A second teacher went to a school administrator at 12:30 pm, saying the teacher had taken it upon herself to search the student's backpack. A third teacher told administrators shortly before 1:00 pm that the student had shown another student at recess they had a gun and threatened the child that he would shoot them if they reported it. Reportedly the teacher was told to "wait out the situation" as "the school day was almost over," while another school employee was denied permission to search the student and his belongings. About an hour before she was shot, Zwerner also reportedly texted an unidentified individual that the student claimed to have a gun and that administrators were not helping.

Shooting 
During a routine lesson, at approximately 2p.m. local time on January 6, 2023, a six-year-old male student pointed a 9mm Taurus pistol at Zwerner and then shot at her when she tried to reach out for the weapon. The bullet first passed through her hand and then lodged in her abdomen. Police reported that the shooting was intentional. Police report that there was no struggle or warning given before the student discharged the gun. The child's mother legally owned the gun that the student brought to the school in his backpack.

Immediately after being shot, Zwerner escorted all of her students out of the classroom and away from the shooter while another staff member, according to police, restrained the shooter until police took him into juvenile detention.

Victim 
Abigail Zwerner is a 25-year-old first grade school teacher, employed at Richneck Elementary School. Zwerner's injuries were initially described as life-threatening, although her condition improved and she was described as "stable" on January 8, 2023, and released from the hospital in mid-January 2023.

Aftermath 
Richneck Elementary School remained closed during the subsequent week. The school announced that Principal Briana Foster Newton had left the position shortly before the school re-opened on January 30. Additionally, school assistant principal Dr. Ebony Parker resigned before the school re-opened, and the school district superintendent George Parker III was voted out effective February 1. The school re-opened with additional safety measures in the form of two permanent school division security officers, two metal detectors, doors installed in previously open areas, and all students receiving clear backpacks.

Legal 
The child shooter was arrested and remained in a healthcare facility as of January13, 2023. Because of his very young age, the child could not be identified. On January 13, police stated they did not know about the tip that the shooter was armed before the shooting.

The shooting sparked conversations about the legal culpability of very young children and comparisons to the February 29, 2000 killing of Kayla Rolland when a six-year-old boy fatally shot Rolland at Buell Elementary School in Mount Morris Township, Michigan. The boy was not charged with murder due to his age, though his uncle was convicted of manslaughter. In an NBC News opinion piece, a clinical psychologist emphasized the limitations of children's moral development and cognition of events and called for compassion to be extended to the shooter and for the provision of care and rehabilitation, as opposed to incarceration.

On January 25, Zwerner's attorney, Diane Toscano, stated that they intended to file a lawsuit regarding multiple failures by the administration to respond to concerns that the student had a gun on the school campus.

Responses 
Newport News mayor Phillip Jones described the shooting as "a red flag for our country", also saying, "I do think that after this event, there is going to be a nationwide discussion on how these sorts of things can be prevented." Professor and gun violence expert Daniel Webster of Johns Hopkins University stated that gun violence by children was increasing in frequency.

The American Federation of Teachers president Randi Weingarten called for government action to prevent guns from being taken into schools: "When will the shock of gunshots in school be enough to inspire the action necessary to prevent guns in schools and the shattering of lives it causes?" Giffords Law Center to Prevent Gun Violence lawyer Allison Anderman criticized Virginia for not having laws requiring guns to be securely stored. Virginia governor Glenn Youngkin shared his belief that Virginia had "some of the toughest gun laws in the nation" and spoke of a need for harsher criminal sentencing and improved mental health care.

Later in January, the parents of the six-year-old shooter released an anonymized statement via their attorney that stated that he had an acute disability.

Similar event 
On February 16, 2023, another six-year-old child took a gun to a school in Virginia. The mother of a child in the school claimed that the boy threatened to shoot her daughter. The boy's mother was charged with contributing to the delinquency of a minor and allowing access to a loaded firearm by children.

See also

List of attacks related to primary schools
List of school shootings in the United States

References

2023 in Virginia
Attacks in the United States in 2023
Attacks on buildings and structures in 2023
Elementary school shootings in the United States
History of Newport News, Virginia
January 2023 events in the United States
Non-fatal shootings
School shootings committed by pupils
School shootings in the United States